Wynola is an unincorporated community located in the Spencer Valley in San Diego County, California.

Wynola is the site of the Spencer Valley School, a one-room public elementary school with a student population of 30-35 children. It is the only school in the Spencer Valley School District, founded in 1876.  Built in 1905, the present one room schoolhouse replaced an earlier structure.  In 1987, additional buildings were added providing modern facilities as a complement to the original building.

Climate
According to the Köppen Climate Classification system, Wynola has a warm-summer Mediterranean climate, abbreviated "Csa" on climate maps.

References

External links
 Ramona 1901 1:125,000 U.S. Geological Survey Topography Map Shows Wynola in 1901.
 USGS Map Name:  Julian, CA from Topoquest website, accessed 2/25/2013  Shows Wynola in a current USGS topographic map, and mine locations.

Unincorporated communities in San Diego County, California
Unincorporated communities in California